Marco Randrianantoanina (born 24 August 1983) is a footballer who played as a left-back or left midfielder. Born in France, he made one appearance for the Madagascar national team. His brother Claudio is also a footballer.

Heart attack 
On 18 January 2008, Randriana collapsed after suffering from a heart attack during Chamois Niortais' match against Sedan. He lost consciousness and was treated on the pitch with a defibrillator. He was transferred to hospital where his condition improved.

Post-playing life 
Randriana retired from playing football aged 24. He worked as a real estate agent for two years and set up a business for passenger transport.

References

External links 
 
 

1983 births
Living people
People from Bourg-la-Reine
People with acquired Malagasy citizenship
Malagasy footballers
Madagascar international footballers
Association football defenders
Birmingham City F.C. players
CS Sedan Ardennes players
FC Gueugnon players
Stade Brestois 29 players
Chamois Niortais F.C. players
French sportspeople of Malagasy descent
Footballers from Hauts-de-Seine
Malagasy expatriate footballers
French expatriate footballers
French expatriate sportspeople in England
Malagasy expatriate sportspeople in England
Expatriate footballers in England